Jose Maria Redondo (March 9, 1830 – June 18, 1878) was a Mexican-American entrepreneur, member of the Arizona Territorial Legislature, and mayor of Yuma, Arizona. Jose Maria Redondo is known as the father of the Yuma Territorial Prison. He also changed the name of Arizona City to Yuma and became wealthy from mining and irrigation in Arizona.

External links 
 Jose Maria Redondo | Find A Grave 
 C-SPAN Cities Tour - Yuma: Yuma Territorial Prison
 Jose Maria Redondo

1830 births
Mexican businesspeople
1878 deaths
Mayors of places in Arizona
People from Yuma, Arizona
History of Yuma County, Arizona
American frontier
American politicians of Mexican descent
19th-century Mexican politicians
19th-century American politicians
19th-century American businesspeople